Govankoppa is a village in Dharwad district of Karnataka, India.

Demographics 
As of the 2011 Census of India there were 293 households in Govankoppa and a total population of 1,436 consisting of 742 males and 694 females. There were 194 children ages 0-6.

References

Villages in Dharwad district